KALM (1290 AM) is a radio station broadcasting a Gospel format to the Thayer, Missouri, United States, area.  The station is currently owned by E-Communications, LLC and features programming from Westwood One and Premiere Networks.

History
On February 25, 2008 the FCC granted approval for assignment of the license to E-Communications LLC from Ozark Radio Network Inc.  The assignment was consummated on April 24, 2008.  Robert Eckman is the managing member of E-Communications, LLC.  According to the FCC ownership records, Robert Eckman is a 50% owner of E-Communications along with a 50% ownership by Rebecca Eckman.

References

External links

ALM
News and talk radio stations in the United States
Radio stations established in 1953
1953 establishments in Missouri